is a Japanese snowboarder. He placed 27th in the men's parallel giant slalom event at the 2010 Winter Olympics.

References

1987 births
Living people
Japanese male snowboarders
Olympic snowboarders of Japan
Snowboarders at the 2010 Winter Olympics
Sportspeople from Osaka Prefecture
21st-century Japanese people